Christophe Bigot (born December 23, 1965, Neuilly-sur-Seine France) served as the French ambassador to Israel in the years 2009 - 2013. He is fluent in English, German and French.

Career 

Bigot was posted to the French Permanent Mission to the United Nations in New York, 1997–2001, Deputy Director of Southern Africa and Indian Ocean, 2001–2004, First Counselor, Deputy Ambassador in Tel Aviv, 2004–2007, Advisor to the Minister of Foreign and European Affairs, 2007–2009, in charge of North Africa, Near and Middle East.

He visited Sderot on September 16, 2009, to show solidarity with its residents.

His residence in Jerusalem was in the Talbiya neighborhood.

On Tuesday, April 24, 2012, while hiking alone in the Judean desert near Nabi Musa, he was robbed by two assailants. Bigot complied with their demands and was left stranded though unharmed. He was robbed of his cellphone and wallet.

Since September 2013, by decision of François Hollande, he was put in charge of the strategy department of the French foreign security agency (DGSE). He was succeeded as ambassador by Patrick Maisonnave.

References

 http://ambafrance-il.org/spip.php?article6971
 http://ca.news.yahoo.com/nphotos/French-ambassador-Christophe-Bigot-left-delivers-a-letter-to-Noam-Shalit/photo/04092009/24/photo/photos-n-world-french-ambassador-christophe-bigot-delivers-letter-noam-shalit.html
 https://web.archive.org/web/20120304065453/http://www.daylife.com/photo/05BR6gc17EfQT?q=christophe+bigot
 https://web.archive.org/web/20120304065442/http://www.daylife.com/photo/09ra9pp5gkazw

1965 births
Ambassadors of France to Israel
Living people
École Polytechnique alumni
People from Neuilly-sur-Seine